Sweet Bay is a settlement in Newfoundland and Labrador. It was settled sometime in the early 1800s, primarily as a fishing settlement.

Populated places in Newfoundland and Labrador